The consolidation of the Iranian Revolution refers to a turbulent process of Islamic Republic stabilization, following the completion of the Islamic revolution. After the Shah of Iran and his regime were overthrown by Islamic revolutionaries in February 1979, Iran was in a "revolutionary crisis mode" from this time until 1982 or 1983. Its economy and the apparatus of government collapsed. Military and security forces were in disarray.

Following the events of the Islamic revolution, Marxist guerrillas and federalist parties revolted in some regions comprising Khuzistan, Kurdistan, and Gonbad-e Qabus, which resulted in fighting between them and the Islamic forces. These revolts began in April 1979 and lasted for several months to more than a year, depending on the region. Recently published documents show that United States was afraid of those revolts. National Security Advisor Zbigniew Brzezinski discussed with his staff about a possible American invasion of Iran by using Turkish bases and territory if the Soviets would decide to repeat the Afghanistan scenario in Iran.

By 1983, Khomeini and his supporters had crushed the rival factions and consolidated power. Elements that played a part in both the crisis and its end were the Iran hostage crisis, the invasion of Iran by Saddam Hussein's Iraq, and the presidency of Abolhassan Banisadr.

Conflicts amongst revolutionaries
With the fall of the Shah, the glue that unified the various ideological (religious, liberal, secularist, Marxist, and Communist) and class (bazaari merchant, secular middle class, poor) factions of the revolution—opposed to the Shah—was gone. Different interpretations of the broad goals of the revolution (an end to tyranny, more Islamic and less American and Western influence, more social justice and less inequality) and different interests, vied for influence.

Some observers believe "what began as an authentic and anti-dictatorial popular revolution based on a broad coalition of all anti-Shah forces was soon transformed into an Islamic fundamentalist power-grab," that significant support came from Khomeini's non-theocratic allies who had thought he intended to be more a spiritual guide than a ruler—Khomeini being in his mid-70s, having never held public office, been out of Iran for more than a decade, and having told questioners things like "the religious dignitaries do not want to rule."

Another view Khomeini had was "overwhelming ideological, political and organizational hegemony," and non-theocratic groups never seriously challenged Khomeini's movement in popular support.

Still another view is that of government supporters (such as Hamid Ansari) who insist that Iranians opposed to the new ruling state were "fifth columnists" led by foreign countries attempting to overthrow the Iranian government.

Khomeini and his loyalists in the revolutionary organizations prevailed, making use of unwanted allies, (such as Mehdi Bazargan's Provisional Revolutionary Government), and eliminating one-by-one with skillful timing both them and their adversaries from Iran's political stage, and implemented Khomeini's velayat- faqih design for an Islamic Republic led by himself as Supreme Leader.

Organizations of the revolution

The most important bodies of the revolution were the Revolutionary Council, the Revolutionary Guards, Revolutionary Tribunals, Islamic Republican Party, and at the local level revolutionary cells turned local committees (komitehs).

While the moderate Bazargan and his government (temporarily) reassured the middle class, it became apparent they did not have power over the "Khomeinist" revolutionary bodies, particularly the Revolutionary Council (the "real power" in the revolutionary state) and later the Islamic Republican Party. Inevitably the overlapping authority of the Revolutionary Council (which had the power to pass laws) and Bazargan's government was a source of conflict, despite the fact that both had been approved by and/or put in place by Khomeini.

This conflict lasted only a few months, however, as the provisional government fell shortly after American Embassy officials were taken hostage on November 4, 1979. Bazargan's resignation was received by Khomeini without complaint, saying "Mr. Bazargan ... was a little tired and preferred to stay on the sidelines for a while." Khomeini later described his appointment of Bazargan as a "mistake".

The Revolutionary Guard, or Pasdaran-e Enqelab, was established by Khomeini on May 5, 1979, as a counterweight both to the armed groups of the left, and to the Iranian military, which had been part of the Shah's power base. 6,000 persons were initially enlisted and trained, but the guard eventually grew into "a full-scale" military force. It has been described as "without a doubt the strongest institution of the revolution".

Serving under the Pasdaran were/are the Baseej-e Mostaz'afin ("Oppressed Mobilization"), volunteers originally made up of those too old or young to serve in other bodies. Baseej have also been used to attack demonstrators and newspaper offices that they believe to be enemies of the revolution.

Another revolutionary organization was the Islamic Republican Party started by Khomeini lieutenant Seyyed Mohammad Hosseini Beheshti in February 1979. Made up of bazaari and political clergy, it worked to establish theocratic government by velayat-e faqih in Iran, outmaneuvering opponents and wielding power on the street through the Hezbollah.

The first komiteh or Revolutionary Committees "sprang up everywhere" as autonomous organizations in late 1978. After the monarchy fell, the committees grew in number and power but not discipline. In Tehran alone there were 1,500 committees. Komiteh served as "the eyes and ears" of the new government, and are credited by critics with "many arbitrary arrests, executions and confiscations of property".

Also enforcing the will of the new government were the Hezbollahi (followers of the Party of God), "strong-arm thugs" who attacked demonstrators and offices of newspapers critical of Khomeini.

Non-Khomeini groups
Two major political groups formed after the fall of the shah that clashed with pro-Khomeini groups and were eventually suppressed were the National Democratic Front (NDF) and the Muslim People's Republic Party (MPRP). The first was a somewhat more leftist version of the National Front. The MPRP was a competitor to the Islamic Republican Party that, unlike that body, favored pluralism, opposed summary executions and attacks on peaceful demonstrations and was associated with Grand Ayatollah Mohammad Kazem Shariatmadari.

Establishment of Islamic Republic Government

Referendum of 12 Farvardin
On March 30 and 31 (Farvardin 10, 11) a referendum was held over whether to replace the monarchy with an "Islamic Republic"—a term not defined on the ballot. Supporting the vote and the change were the Islamic Republican Party, Iran Freedom Movement, National Front, Muslim People's Republic Party, and the Tudeh Party. Urging a boycott were the National Democratic Front, Fadayan, and several Kurdish parties. Khomeini called for a massive turnout, and most Iranians supported the change. Following the vote, the government announced that 98.2% had voted in favor, and Khomeini declaring the result a victory of "the oppressed ... over the arrogant."

Writing of the constitution

On June 18, 1979, the Freedom Movement released its draft constitution for the Islamic Republic that it had been working on since Khomeini was in exile. It included a Guardian Council to veto un-Islamic legislation, but had no Guardian Jurist Ruler. Leftists found the draft too conservative and in need of major changes, but Khomeini declared it 'correct'. To approve the new constitution a 73-member Assembly of Experts for Constitution was elected that summer. Critics complained that "vote-rigging, violence against undesirable candidates and the dissemination of false information" was used to "produce an assembly overwhelmingly dominated by clergy loyal to Khomeini."

The Assembly was originally conceived of as a way of expediting the draft constitution so as to prevent leftist alterations. Ironically, Khomeini (and the assembly) now rejected the constitution—its correctness notwithstanding—and Khomeini declared that the new government should be based "100% on Islam."

Between mid-August and mid-November 1979, the Assembly commenced to draw up a new constitution, one leftists found even more objectionable. In addition to President, the Assembly added on a more powerful post of Guardian Jurist Ruler intended for Khomeini, with control of the military and security services, and power to appoint several top government and judicial officials. The power and number of clerics on the Council of Guardians was increased. The Council was given control over elections for President, Parliament, and the "experts" that elected the Supreme Leader, as well as laws passed by the legislature.

The new constitution was approved by referendum on December 2 and 3, 1979. It was supported by the Revolutionary Council and other groups, but opposed by some clerics, including Ayatollah Mohammad Kazem Shariatmadari, and by secularists such as the National Front who urged a boycott. Again, over 98% were reported to have voted in favor, but turnout was smaller than for the 11, 12 Farvardin referendum on an Islamic Republic.

Hostage crisis

Helping to pass the constitution, suppress moderates and otherwise radicalize the revolution was the holding of 52 American diplomats hostage for over a year. In late October 1979, the exiled and dying Shah was admitted into the United States for cancer treatment. In Iran there was an immediate outcry and both Khomeini and leftist groups demanding the Shah's return to Iran for trial and execution. On 4 November 1979 youthful Islamists, calling themselves Muslim Student Followers of the Imam's Line, invaded the embassy compound and seized its staff. Revolutionaries were reminded of how 26 years earlier the Shah had fled abroad while the American CIA and British intelligence organized a coup d'état to overthrow his nationalist opponent.

The holding of hostages was very popular and continued for months even after the death of the Shah. As Khomeini explained to his future President Banisadr,

This action has many benefits. ... This has united our people. Our opponents do not dare act against us. We can put the constitution to the people's vote without difficulty, and carry out presidential and parliamentary elections.

With great publicity the students released documents from the American embassy—or "nest of spies"—showing moderate Iranian leaders had met with U.S. officials (similar evidence of high-ranking Islamists having done so did not see the light of day). Among the casualties of the hostage crisis was Prime Minister Bazargan who resigned in November, unable to enforce the government's order to release the hostages. It is from this time that "the term 'liberal' became a pejorative designation for those who questioned the fundamental tendencies of the revolution," according to Hamid Algar, a supporter of Khomeini.

The prestige of Khomeini and the hostage taking was further enhanced when an American attempt to rescue the hostages failed because of a sand storm, widely believed in Iran to be the result of divine intervention. Another long-term effect of the crisis was harm to the Iranian economy, which was, and continues to be, subject to American economic sanctions.

Iran–Iraq War
In September 1980, Iraq, whose government was Sunni Muslim and Arab nationalist, invaded Shia Muslim Iran in an attempt to seize the oil-rich province of Khuzestan and destroy the revolution in its infancy. In the face of this external threat, Iranians rallied behind their new government. The country was "galvanized" and patriotic fervor helped to stop and reverse the Iraqi advance. By early 1982 Iran had regained almost all the territory lost to the invasion.

Like the hostage crisis, the war served as an opportunity for the government to strengthen Islamic revolutionary ardor at the expense of its remaining allies-turned-opponents, such as the MEK. The Revolutionary Guard grew in self-confidence and numbers. The revolutionary committees asserted themselves, enforcing blackouts, curfews, and vehicle searches for subversives. Food and fuel rationing cards were distributed at mosques, "providing the authorities with another means for ensuring political conformity." While enormously costly and destructive, the war "rejuvenate[d] the drive for national unity and Islamic revolution" and "inhibited fractious debate and dispute" in Iran.

Suppression of opposition
In early March, Khomeini announced, "do not use this term, 'democratic.' That is the Western style," giving pro-democracy liberals (and later leftists) a taste of disappointments to come.

In succession the National Democratic Front was banned in August 1979, the provisional government was disempowered in November, the Muslim People's Republic Party banned in January 1980, the People's Mujahedin of Iran supporters came under attack in February 1980, a purge of universities was begun in March 1980, and leftist Islamist Abolhassan Banisadr was impeached in June 1981.

Explanations for why the opposition was crushed include its lack of unity. According to Asghar Schirazi, the moderates lacked ambition and were not well organised, while the radicals were "unrealistic" about the conservatism of the Iranian masses and unprepared to work with moderates to fight against theocracy. Moderate Islamists were "credulous and submissive" towards Khomeini.

Mahmoud Taleghani
In April 1979, Ayatollah Mahmoud Taleghani, a supporter of the left, warned against a 'return to despotism'. Revolutionary Guards responded by arresting two of his sons but thousands of his supporters marched in the streets chanting 'Taleghani, you are the soul of the revolution! Down with the reactionaries!' Khomeini summoned Taleghani to Qom where he was given a severe criticism after which the press was called and told by Khomeini: 'Mr. Taleghani is with us and he is sorry for what happened.' Khomeini pointedly did not refer to him as Ayatollah Taleghani.

Newspaper closings
In mid August, shortly after the election of the constitution-writing Assembly of Experts, several dozen newspapers and magazines opposing Khomeini's idea of Islamic government—theocratic rule by jurists or velayat-e faqih—were shut down under a new press law banning "counter-revolutionary policies and acts." Protests against the press closings were organized by the National Democratic Front (NDF), and tens of thousands massed at the gates of the University of Tehran. Khomeini angrily denounced these protests saying, "we thought we were dealing with human beings. It is evident we are not." He condemned the protesters as

wild animals. We will not tolerate them any more ... After each revolution several thousand of these corrupt elements are executed in public and burnt and the story is over. They are not allowed to publish newspapers.

Hundreds were injured by "rocks, clubs, chains and iron bars" when Hezbollahi attacked the protesters. Before the end of the month a warrant was issued for the arrest of the NDF's leader.

Muslim People's Republican Party

In December the moderate Islamic party Muslim People's Republican Party (MPRP), and its spiritual leader Mohammad Kazem Shariatmadari had become a new rallying point for Iranians who wanted democracy not theocracy. In early December riots broke out in Shariatmadari's Azeri home region. Members of the MPRP and Shariatmadari's followers in Tabriz took to the streets and seized the television station, using it to "broadcast demands and grievances." The government reacted quickly, sending Revolutionary Guards to retake the TV station, mediators to defuse complaints and staging a massive pro-Khomeini counter-demonstration in Tabriz. The party was suppressed with many of the aides of the elderly Shariatmadari being put under house arrest, two of whom were later executed.

Islamist left
In January 1980 Abolhassan Banisadr, an adviser to Khomeini, was elected president of Iran. He was opposed by the more radical Islamic Republic party, who controlled the parliament, having won the first parliamentary election of March–May 1980. Banisadr was compelled to accept an IRP-oriented prime minister, Mohammad-Ali Rajai, he declared "incompetent." Both Banisadr and the IRP were supported by Khomeini.

At the same time, erstwhile revolutionary allies of the Khomeinists—the Islamist modernist group People's Mujahedin of Iran (or MEK)—were being suppressed by Khomeinists. Khomeini attacked the MEK as elteqati (eclectic), contaminated with Gharbzadegi ("the Western plague"), and as monafeqin (hypocrites) and kafer (unbelievers). In February 1980 concentrated attacks by hezbollahi toughs began on the meeting places, bookstores, newsstands of Mujahideen and other leftists driving the left underground in Iran.

The next month saw the beginning of the "Iranian Cultural Revolution". Universities, a leftist bastion, were closed for two years to purge them of opponents to theocratic rule. A purge of the state bureaucracy began in July. 20,000 teachers and nearly 8,000 military officers deemed too "Westernized" were dismissed.

Khomeini sometimes felt the need to use takfir (declaring someone guilty of apostasy, a capital crime) to deal with his opponents. When leaders of the National Front party called for a demonstration in mid-1981 against a new law on qesas, or traditional Islamic retaliation for a crime, Khomeini threatened its leaders with the death penalty for apostasy "if they did not repent." The leaders of the Freedom Movement of Iran and Banisadr were compelled to make  public apologies on television and radio because they had supported the Front's appeal.

By March 1981, an attempt by Khomeini to forge a reconciliation between Banisadr and IRP leaders had failed and Banisadr became a rallying point "for all doubters and dissidents" of the theocracy, including the MEK. Three months later Khomeini finally sided with the Islamic Republic party against Banisadr who then issued a call for "resistance to dictatorship". Rallies in favor of Banisadr were suppressed by Hezbollahi, and he was impeached by the Majlis.

The Islamic Republic unleashed "an unprecedented reign of terror", shooting demonstrators, including children. In less than six months, 2,665 persons, 90 per cent of whom were MEK members, were executed. By early 1981, Iranian authorities had closed down MEK offices, outlawed their newspapers, prohibited their demonstrations, and issued arrest warrants for the MEK leaders, forcing the organization go underground once again. The MEK retaliated against the IRP. On the 28 June 1981. A bombing of the office of the Islamic Republic Party killed around 70 high-ranking officials, cabinet members and members of parliament, including Mohammad Beheshti, the secretary-general of the party and head of the Islamic Party's judicial system. His successor Mohammad Javad Bahonar was in turn assassinated on September 2. These events and other assassinations weakened the Islamic Party but the hoped-for mass uprising and armed struggle against the Khomeiniists was crushed.

Another opposition to the Khomeinist government was violent as well. Communist guerrillas and federalist parties revolted in some regions comprising Khuzistan, Kurdistan and Gonbad-e Qabus which resulted in fighting among them and revolutionary forces. These revolts began in April 1979 and lasted for several months or years depending on the region. In May 1979, the Furqan Group (Guruh-i Furqan) assassinated an important lieutenant of Khomeini, Morteza Motahhari.

See also
 Consolidation of the Cuban Revolution
 Guardianship of the Islamic Jurists
 History of the Islamic Republic of Iran
 Human rights in the Islamic Republic of Iran
 Islamic Government: Governance of the Jurist
 Islamic Principlism in Iran
 Leftist guerrilla groups of Iran
 List of modern conflicts in the Middle East
 Nojeh coup plot
 Organizations of the Iranian Revolution
 Persecution of Baháʼís
 Persian Constitutional Revolution
 Supreme Leader of Iran
 1979 energy crisis
 Abolhassan Banisadr

References and notes

Bibliography

Further reading
 
 
 
 
 
  (Chapter 6: Iran: Revolutionary Fundamentalism in Power.)
 Kapuściński, Ryszard. Shah of Shahs. Translated from Polish by William R. Brand and Katarzyna Mroczkowska-Brand. New York: Vintage International, 1992.
 Kurzman, Charles. The Unthinkable Revolution. Cambridge, MA & London: Harvard University Press, 2004.
 Ladjevardi, Habib (editor), Memoirs of Shapour Bakhtiar, Harvard University Press, 1996.
 Legum, Colin, et al., eds. Middle East Contemporary Survey: Volume III, 1978–79. New York: Holmes & Meier Publishers, 1980.
 Milani, Abbas, The Persian Sphinx: Amir Abbas Hoveyda and the Riddle of the Iranian Revolution, Mage Publishers, 2000, .
 Munson, Henry, Jr. Islam and Revolution in the Middle East. New Haven: Yale University Press, 1988.
 Nafisi, Azar. "Reading Lolita in Tehran." New York: Random House, 2003.
 Nobari, Ali Reza, ed. Iran Erupts: Independence: News and Analysis of the Iranian National Movement. Stanford: Iran-America Documentation Group, 1978.
 Nomani, Farhad & Sohrab Behdad, Class and Labor in Iran; Did the Revolution Matter? Syracuse University Press. 2006. 
 Pahlavi, Mohammad Reza, Response to History, Stein & Day Pub, 1980, .
 Rahnema, Saeed & Sohrab Behdad, eds. Iran After the Revolution: Crisis of an Islamic State. London: I.B. Tauris, 1995.
 Sick, Gary. All Fall Down: America's Tragic Encounter with Iran. New York: Penguin Books, 1986.
 Shawcross, William, The Shah's Last Ride: The Death of an Ally, Touchstone, 1989, .
 Smith, Frank E. The Iranian Revolution. 1998.
 Society for Iranian Studies, Iranian Revolution in Perspective. Special volume of Iranian Studies, 1980. Volume 13, nos. 1–4.
 Time magazine, January 7, 1980. Man of the Year (Ayatollah Khomeini).
 U.S. Department of State, American Foreign Policy Basic Documents, 1977–1980. Washington, DC: GPO, 1983. JX 1417 A56 1977–80 REF - 67 pages on Iran.
 Yapp, M.E. The Near East Since the First World War: A History to 1995. London: Longman, 1996. Chapter 13: "Iran, 1960–1989."

External links

 "Islamic Revolution of Iran", Encarta( 2009-10-31)
 "The Iranian revolution", Britannica
 The Dynamics of the Iranian Revolution: The Pahlavis' Triumph and Tragedy
 Ian Black, "The Iranian revolution: '30 years on, its legacy still looms large'", An audio slideshow, The Guardian, Tuesday 3 February 2009, The Iranian revolution: '30 years on, its legacy still looms large' (5 min 26 sec).

Historical articles
 The Story of the Revolution – a detailed web resource from the BBC World Service Persian Branch, devoted to the Iranian Revolution (audio recordings in Persian, transcripts in English).
 The Reunion — The Shah of Iran's Court – BBC Radio 4 presents an audio program featuring reminiscences of the Iranian Revolution by key members of the pre-Revolutionary elite.
 Brzezinski's role in the 1979 Iranian Revolution, Payvand, March 10, 2006.
 The Iranian Revolution.
 The Iranian revolution, Cyber Essays.
 The Islamic revolution, Internews.

Analytical articles
 The Last Great Revolution Turmoil and Transformation in Iran by Robin Wright.
 Islamic Revolution by Bernard Lewis
 Islamic Revolution: An Exchange by Abbas Milani, Tomis Kapitan, Reply by Bernard Lewis
 What Are the Iranians Dreaming About? by Michel Foucault
 The Seductions of Islamism, Revisiting Foucault and the Iranian Revolution by Janet Afary and Kevin B. Anderson
 The Religious Background of the 1979 Revolution in Iran
 What Happens When Islamists Take Power? The Case of Iran
 Power? The Case of Iran The, Iranian Revolution by Ted Grant
 Class Analysis of the Iranian Revolution of 1979  by Satya J. Gabriel
 The Cause of The Iranian Revolution by Jon Curme
 History of Undefeated, A few words in commemoration of the 1979 Revolution By Mansoor Hekmat, Communist Thinker and Revolutionary

Revolution in pictures
 iranrevolution.com by Akbar Nazemi
 Iranian Revolution, Photos by Kaveh Golestan
 Photos from Kave Kazemi
 The Iranian Revolution in Pictures
 Iranian revolution in pictures, BBC World
 Slideshow with audio commentary of the legacy of iranian revolution after 30 years

Revolution in videos
 Video Archive of Iranian Revolution

1979 in Iran
Aftermath of the Iranian Revolution
Conflicts involving the People's Mojahedin Organization of Iran
Iranian civil wars
Islamism
Mohammad Reza Pahlavi
Ruhollah Khomeini